In mathematics, a hyperbolic point is a certain kind of point, one of:
A point in a hyperbolic geometry
A point of negative Gaussian curvature on a smooth surface
A hyperbolic equilibrium point of a dynamical system